The SC Siemensstadt Rugby is a German rugby union club from the Siemensstadt locality of Berlin.

History
The rugby department predates the formation of the mother club SC Siemensstadt in 1975, which was formed in a merger of TV Siemensstadt and SpVgg Wacker Siemensstadt. The department, formed in 1923, was initially part of the Sportvereinigung Siemens and later became part of TV Siemensstadt before becoming a founding member of the Rugby-Bundesliga in 1971.

The club remained part of the Rugby-Bundesliga until 1974 when it was relegated. After playing in the 2nd Rugby-Bundesliga and dropping to the Rugby-Regionalliga the club made a return to the second tier in 2012 with the expansion of the Bundesliga and 2nd Bndesliga. From 2013 onwards it merged its rugby team with the team of the Berlin Grizzlies to play as SG Siemensstadt/Grizzlies. Under this name the club achieved promotion to the Rugby-Bundesliga in 2014.

The joint team qualified for the championship round of the 2014–15 Rugby-Bundesliga but was removed from competition in March 2015 after failing to field in two consecutive matches. The club moved back to the tier three Rugby-Regionalliga for the 2015–16 season.

Recent seasons
Recent seasons of the club:

 Until 2001, when the single-division Bundesliga was established, the season was divided in autumn and spring, a Vorrunde and Endrunde, whereby the top teams of the Rugby-Bundesliga would play out the championship while the bottom teams together with the autumn 2nd Bundesliga champion would play for Bundesliga qualification. The remainder of the 2nd Bundesliga teams would play a spring round to determine the relegated clubs. Where two placing's are shown, the first is autumn, the second spring. In 2012 the Bundesliga was expanded from ten to 24 teams and the 2nd Bundesliga from 20 to 24 with the leagues divided into four regional divisions.

References

External links
 Official website
 Official website of the rugby department

German rugby union clubs
Rugby clubs established in 1923
Rugby union in Berlin
1923 establishments in Germany